Tito Sawe (10 July 1960 – 23 February 2002) was a Kenyan sprinter. He competed in the men's 4 × 400 metres relay at the 1988 Summer Olympics.

References

1960 births
2002 deaths
Athletes (track and field) at the 1988 Summer Olympics
Kenyan male sprinters
Olympic athletes of Kenya
Place of birth missing
African Games medalists in athletics (track and field)
African Games silver medalists for Kenya
Athletes (track and field) at the 1987 All-Africa Games